Interstate 295 (I-295) is a  auxiliary Interstate Highway in the US state of Maine from I-95 in Scarborough to I-95 in West Gardiner. The highway was designated the Richard A. Coleman Highway in 2015 by the Maine Legislature. The highway serves as a bypass of Lewiston–Auburn and serves the Portland metropolitan area. It takes a more direct route between Portland and Augusta, the state capital, than its parent I-95. It also is toll-free, unlike I-95, which carries the tolled Maine Turnpike.

Route description

I-295 branches off from exit 44 of I-95 (Maine Turnpike) providing access to downtown Portland, Maine, and then generally follows the Atlantic coast and Kennebec River until it merges back into I-95 in West Gardiner  to the north at exit 103.

After splitting from I-95, I-295 has a toll plaza just before its own exit 1. I-295's first exit is in South Portland, giving access to The Maine Mall (southbound) and South Portland and Scarborough (northbound). At exit 4, US Route 1 (US 1) joins I-295, and the two highways run concurrently for the next . After crossing the Fore River, the highway passes through downtown Portland, which can be accessed via exits 4 through 8. North of the downtown area, I-295 crosses the Tukey's Bridge over the Back Cove, after which US 1 departs at exit 9. Running parallel with US 1, I-295 meets the eastern terminus of Falmouth Spur at exit 11 in the town of Falmouth, with a southbound exit and northbound entrance. After passing through Yarmouth and Freeport, exit 28 provides access to the town of Brunswick, where US 1 turns east away from I-295. Continuing north, the highway's last exit is exit 51, which gives access to Gardiner. After a toll plaza, I-295 merges back with I-95, which heads north toward Augusta. As an Interstate Highway, all of I-295 is included in the National Highway System, a network of roads important to the country's economy, defense, and mobility.

History

1960 to 2004
In 1960, Tukey's Bridge was completed. It was named for Lemuel Tukey, a tavern owner and toll collector for the Back Cove Bridge in the late 18th century. The Falmouth Spur of the Maine Turnpike to Yarmouth opened the next year, in 1961.

Additional urban sections opened through Portland in 1971. This was followed in 1973 by the opening of I-295 through Brunswick to Topsham, then in 1974 by the opening of the section from the Maine Turnpike in Scarborough to South Portland. The section from Topsham to Gardiner opened in 1977.

2004 extension
In 2004, to clear up confusion, I-95 was redesignated to continue along the Maine Turnpike for its entire length. I-295 was extended past the Falmouth Spur as a redesignation of I-95, to where it merges back into the turnpike in West Gardiner  to the north.

At the same time, the exits were renumbered; previously they had been numbered more or less sequentially from south to north—there were skipped numbers, for example, there was no exit 23.  After the changes the exits renumbered to mile-log in relation to the Scarborough junction, except for the exits in Portland and South Portland, which remained the same. Exits on I-95 in Maine were similarly renumbered based on mileage.

Speed limits
This occurred as the result of a new law passed in 2013 by the Maine Legislature allowing the Maine Department of Transportation (MaineDOT) to set speed limits on Interstate highways with the approval of the Maine State Police, instead of appealing to the Legislature.

Naming
In 2015, the Maine Legislature unanimously voted to name the highway's entire length for Richard A. Coleman, a MaineDOT employee since 1956, who has been involved with many Maine transportation projects. He was involved in projects ranging from Maine's Interstates to the Penobscot Narrows Bridge and Observatory. Coleman declined comment on the naming, only telling the Kennebec Journal that while, the naming is humbling, he found it uncomfortable. Maine Senator Roger Katz, the sponsor of the bill, said "Very few people have heard of Dick Coleman, but as he drives around the state, he must feel a great deal of pride looking at his decades of work."

Emergency routes
In 2019, MaineDOT began signing emergency routes along roads near I-295. The routes generally lead from one exit to the next exit and are meant to be used when sections of the highway must be closed due to an accident or other disruption. In such an event, electronic signs will be activated and flaggers deployed to direct drivers to use the appropriate emergency route to lead them around the closure and maintain traffic flow. Northbound routes are designated with a single letter, while southbound routes are designated with double letters. This system was first used when a section of highway was closed due to the death of a Maine State Trooper in an accident.

Exit list

References

External links

I-295 on Kurumi.com
Steve Anderson's BostonRoads.com: Interstate 295 (Maine)

95-2 Maine
95-2
2 Maine
U.S. 1|295
Transportation in Cumberland County, Maine
Transportation in Sagadahoc County, Maine
Transportation in Kennebec County, Maine